Jacobus Willem Rentmeester (born 28 February 1936), nicknamed "Co" or "Ko", is a Dutch rower. He later became a photojournalist and covered the Vietnam War among other newsworthy events.

Life and career 
Rentmeester was born in 1936 in Amsterdam. He competed with Peter Bakker in double scull and won bronze at the 1959 European Rowing Championships in Mâcon, France. Bakker and Rentmeester reached the finals in double scull for the Netherlands at the 1960 Summer Olympics in Rome where they came fifth. In early 1961, Rentmeester moved to the United States and studied photography at the Art Center College in Los Angeles.

After receiving his Bachelor of Arts, Rentmeester initially started his career as a freelance photographer in 1965 for Life Magazine. A short time later, he joined the LIFE Staff from April 1966 thru 1972 when LIFE Magazine folded. He first covered the Watts Riots in Los Angeles, documenting many of the dramatic events, which earned him his first accolades as a photographer.

Between late 1965 and 1969 Rentmeester was in Asia, where he particularly covered the Vietnam war. One of his pictures showed an M48 tank gunner looking through a gunsight. It was selected as World Press Photo of the Year and notably it was the first color photograph to win the award. He was also in Hong Kong during the extensive civil disturbances in 1967.

After Rentmeester was wounded by a Vietcong sniper near Saigon, he returned to the U.S. in 1972, his pictures from a travel through Indonesia were shown in the Van Gogh Museum in Amsterdam, Smithsonian Institution in Washington DC and Asia House, New York.

In the following years, Rentmeester worked for numerous major publications as a photojournalist and as an advertising photographer

Awards 
 1967: World Press Photo of the Year, 1st prize 
 1972: Magazine photographer of the Year, School of Journalism, University of Missouri
 1973: World Press Photo, 1st prize in category Sports
 1976: New York Art Directors Club award for his photo essay on Thomas Jefferson
 1979: World Press Photo: 2nd prize in category Color picture stories
 1980: Missouri School of Journalism, award for an essay on the U.S. Air Force
 2001: KLM Paul Huf Award , Amsterdam The Netherlands
 2018: Lucy Foundation Award for Outstanding Achievement in Sports Photography

Publications 
 "Three Faces of Indonesia," 1974, Thames & Hudson Ltd.
 "Holland on Ice," 1998, First Edition.
 'FOOTPRINTS" Co Rentmeester 2007, Uitgeverij de Kunst, Weesp, The Netherlands

References

External links 

 Official Website Co-Rentmeester.com 
 Co Rentmeester at worldpressphoto.org
 Co Rentmeester: Oarsman And Photographer
 
 
 

1936 births
Living people
Dutch male rowers
Olympic rowers of the Netherlands
Rowers at the 1960 Summer Olympics
Dutch photojournalists
Photography in Vietnam
War photographers
Rowers from Amsterdam
Life (magazine) photojournalists
European Rowing Championships medalists
Photographers from Amsterdam
20th-century Dutch people